Merriam Modell (19 May 1908 – 1 July 1994) (born Miriam Levant in Manhattan, New York ) was an American writer of short stories, suspense and pulp fiction, who wrote primarily under the pen name Evelyn Piper. Many had a common theme: the domestic conflicts faced by American families.

A graduate of Cornell University, Modell travelled extensively in her younger years, living in Germany from the late 1920s until 1933, after which she returned to the United States. After marriage to Dr. Walter Modell (New York heart specialist, lecturer, teacher, writer) and motherhood (she had one son, John Modell), she began to write and publish short stories, many appearing in The New Yorker.

Films were made of The Nanny (1965) starring Bette Davis, and Bunny Lake Is Missing (1965) starring Carol Lynley and Laurence Olivier.

She died of a pulmonary embolism at Presbyterian University Hospital in Pittsburgh, Pennsylvania.

Partial bibliography

Short stories
 "Literature is Saved", The New Yorker, November 26, 1938, p. 51 
 "Object Lesson", The New Yorker, November 8, 1941, p. 86 
 "Month of August, ’43", The New Yorker, July 31, 1943, p. 55 
 "The Garbage Pails", The New Yorker, June 9, 1945, p. 62 
 "Ordeal by Earring", The New Yorker, November 2, 1946

Novels
The Sound of Years (1946) - as Merriam Modell
My Sister, My Bride (1948) - as Merriam Modell
The Innocent (1949) - nominated in 1950 for Edgar Award (Best First Novel)
The Motive (1950)
The Plot (1951)
The Lady and Her Doctor (1956)
Bunny Lake Is Missing (1957)
Hanno's Doll (1961)
The Naked Murderer (1962)
The Nanny (1964)
The Stand-In (1970)

References

Bibliography
Maria DiBattista (Princeton University): "Afterword". In: Evelyn Piper: Bunny Lake Is Missing (Femmes Fatales: Women Write Pulp) (The Feminist Press at The City University of New York: New York, 2004) 198-219.

1908 births
1994 deaths
20th-century American novelists
American women novelists
Cornell University alumni
Pulp fiction writers
Jewish American novelists
20th-century American women writers
Deaths from pulmonary embolism
20th-century American Jews